Erich Lexer (22 May 1867 in Freiburg im Breisgau – 4 December 1937 in Berlin) was a German surgeon and university lecturer. With Eugen Holländer (1867 - 1932) and Jacques Joseph (1865 - 1934), he is regarded as the pioneer of plastic surgery.

He studied medicine at the University of Würzburg, afterwards working as an assistant to Friedrich Sigmund Merkel in Göttingen (1891) and to Ernst von Bergmann in Berlin (from 1892). Later on, he was a professor of surgery at Albertina University in Königsberg (1905–1910), Friedrich Schiller University of Jena (1910–1919) and Albert Ludwig University of Freiburg (1919–1928). In 1928 he succeeded Ferdinand Sauerbruch at the university clinic in Munich (1928–1936).

He is remembered for his introduction of surgical techniques associated with plastic and cosmetic surgery. He is credited for his pioneer research of forehead lift surgery as a means to lessen the signs of aging in the upper part of the face. In 1921 he pioneered a technique for mammaplastic surgery, a procedure that later became popular in the 1950s. Lexer is also credited as the first physician to advocate subcutaneous mastectomy for treatment of fibrocystic breast disease.

Today, the Erich Lexer Clinic for Aesthetic-Plastic Surgery at the Freiburg Medical Centre is named in his honor.

Published works 
He was the author of a popular surgical textbook, "Lehrbuch der allgemeinen Chirurgie". First published in 1904, it was issued over numerous editions and also translated into English. Other writings by Lexer include: 
 Die Ätiologie und Die Mikro-organismen Der Akuten Osteomyelitis, 1897 – The etiology and the micro-organisms associated with acute osteomyelitis.
 Untersuchungen über Knochenarterien, 1904.
 Die freien Transplantationen, 1924 – The "free" transplantation.
 Die gesamte Wiederherstellungschirurgie, 1931 – The total reconstructive surgery.

References

1867 births
1937 deaths
German surgeons
Physicians from Freiburg im Breisgau
People from the Grand Duchy of Baden
University of Würzburg alumni
Academic staff of the University of Königsberg
Academic staff of the University of Jena
Academic staff of the University of Freiburg
Academic staff of the Ludwig Maximilian University of Munich